Joseph Freiherr Maroicic von Madonna del Monte (6 April 1812 – 17 October 1882) was an Austrian general of Croatian descent.

Early career
Joseph Maroicic was born on 6 April 1812 in Oberswidnik, in the Sáros County of the Kingdom of Hungary (present-day Slovakia). Following in the footsteps of his father, Joseph Maroicic embarked on an army career and  studied at the cadet school in 1825. In 1830 he became an ensign in the 60th Infantry Regiment. Promoted to lieutenant in 1831 and to first lieutenant in 1834, Maroicic was posted to the General Staff. Promoted to captain in 1843, Marocic took part in the First Italian War of Independence (1848). After the Italian war ended, he was promoted to major in 1849 and was made chief of staff of the 3rd Army Corps. After serving as chief of staff of the 4th Army Corps, Maroicic was promoted to lieutenant-colonel and  transferred to the 1st Army Corps with which he served against the Hungarian insurrection. After a short stint at General Headquarters, Maroicic was promoted to colonel in November 1849 and was given command of the Oguliner Grenz Regiment nr. 3. In 1850 he was ennobled a Freiherr and was given the extended title von Madonna del Monte to his name.

General officer
Maroicic was promoted to major-general in 1854 and was given a brigade command in the 6th Army Corps, stationed in Hungary. After the Crimean War, Maroicic took part in the Austrian occupation of Wallachia and Moldavia. In 1859 Maroicic commanded his brigade during the Second Italian War of Independence and served at Solferino. In 1860 Maroicic was promoted to Feldmarschallleutnant and given command of a division.

During the Austro-Prussian War of 1866, Maroicic served on the Italian front in the South Army commanded by Archduke Albrecht. Maroicic commanded the 7th Army Corps, with which he distinguished himself at Custoza. After the defeat of Benedek and the Northern Army at Königgrätz necessitated the transfer of troops from the Italian front northwards to cover Vienna, Maroicic held the line at the Isonzo.

After the war, Maroicic commanded in Budapest and Graz. In 1868 Maroicic was promoted to Feldzeugmeister. In March 1869 Maroicic was given command of the capital Vienna (1869–1881). Maroicic retired from the service on 1 May 1881. He died on 17 October 1882 in Döbling and was buried at the Zentralfriedhof.

See also

 List of Military Order of Maria Theresa recipients of Croatian descent
 List of Croatian soldiers
 Croatian nobility

References

 Adolf Schinzl: Maroicic, Joseph. In: Allgemeine Deutsche Biographie (ADB). Band 20, Duncker & Humblot, Leipzig 1884, S. 400–403.
 Geoffrey Wawro, The Austro-Prussian War. Austria's war with Prussia and Italy in 1866 (New York 2007)

Croatian military personnel in Austrian armies
Barons of Croatia
Croatian nobility
19th-century Croatian people
People of the Military Frontier
1812 births
1882 deaths
People from Svidník
Austro-Hungarian generals
Barons of Austria
People of the Austro-Prussian War
Commanders Cross of the Military Order of Maria Theresa